Angaria aculeata is a species of sea snail, a marine gastropod mollusk in the family Angariidae.

Description

The shell can grow to be 20 mm to 50 mm in length.

Distribution
Angaria aculeata can be found off of the Philippines and Japan.

References

External links
 To World Register of Marine Species

Angariidae
Gastropods described in 1843